Burnette could be:

 an incorrect spelling of "brunette".
 Billy Burnette (born 1953), American guitarist
 Dorsey Burnette (1932–1979), American rockabilly singer
 Johnny Burnette (1934–1964), American rockabilly and pop singer
 Kurt R. Burnette (born 1955),  bishop of the Byzantine Catholic Eparchy of Passaic
 Reggie Burnette (born 1968), American football player
 Rocky Burnette (born 1953), American rock and roll singer
 Smiley Burnette (1911–1967), American singer-songwriter, musician, film and TV actor

See also 
 Burnet (disambiguation)
 Burnett (disambiguation)